The 2023 Sundance Film Festival took place from January 19 to 29, 2023. The first lineup of competition films was announced on December 7, 2022.

Films

U.S. Dramatic Competition 
 The Accidental Getaway Driver, directed by Sing J. Lee
 All Dirt Roads Taste of Salt, directed by Raven Jackson 
 Fair Play, directed by Chloe Domont 
 Fancy Dance, directed by Erica Tremblay 
 Magazine Dreams, directed by Elijah Bynum 
 Mutt, directed by Vuk Lungulov-Klotz 
 The Persian Version, directed by Maryam Keshavarz 
 Shortcomings, directed and co-produced by Randall Park 
 Sometimes I Think About Dying, directed by Rachel Lambert 
 The Starling Girl, directed by Laurel Parmet 
 Theater Camp, directed by Molly Gordon and Nick Lieberman 
 A Thousand and One, directed by A.V. Rockwell

U.S. Documentary Competition 
 AUM: The Cult at the End of the World, directed by Ben Braun and Chiaki Yanagimoto
 Bad Press, directed by Rebecca Landsberry-Baker and Joe Peeler
 Beyond Utopia, directed by Madeleine Gavin
 The Disappearance of Shere Hite, directed by Nicole Newnham
 Going to Mars: The Nikki Giovanni Project, directed by Joe Brewster and Michèle Stephenson
 Going Varsity in Mariachi, directed by Alejandra Vasquez and Sam Osborn
 Joonam, directed by Sierra Urich
 Little Richard: I Am Everything, directed by Lisa Cortés
 Nam June Paik: Moon is the Oldest TV, directed by Amanda Kim
 A Still Small Voice, directed by Luke Lorentzen
 The Stroll, directed by Kristen Lovell and Zackary Drucker
 Victim/Suspect, directed by Nancy Schwartzman

Premieres 
 Cassandro, directed by Roger Ross Williams
 Cat Person, directed by Susanna Fogel
 Deep Rising, directed by Matthieu Rytz
 The Deepest Breath, directed by Laura McGann
 Drift, directed by Anthony Chen
 Earth Mama, directed by Savanah Leaf
 Eileen, directed by William Oldroyd
 Fairyland, written and directed by Andrew Durham
 Flora and Son, directed by John Carney
 Food and Country, directed by Laura Gabbert
 Invisible Beauty, directed by Bethann Hardison and Frédéric Tcheng
 It's Only Life After All, directed by Alexandria Bombach
 Jamojaya, directed by Justin Chon
 Judy Blume Forever, directed by Davina Pardo and Leah Wolchok
 Landscape with Invisible Hand, directed by Cory Finley
 A Little Prayer, directed by Angus MacLachlan
 Murder in Big Horn, directed by Razelle Benally and Matthew Galkin
 Passages, directed by Ira Sachs
 Past Lives, directed by Celine Song
 PLAN C, directed by Tracy Droz Tragos
 The Pod Generation, written and directed by Sophie Barthes
 Pretty Baby: Brooke Shields, directed by Lana Wilson
 Radical, directed by Christopher Zalla
 Rotting in the Sun, directed by Sebastián Silva
 Rye Lane, directed by Raine Allen-Miller
 Still: A Michael J. Fox Movie, directed by Davis Guggenheim
 You Hurt My Feelings, directed by Nicole Holofcener

World Cinema Dramatic Competition 
 Animalia, directed by Sofia Alaoui
 Bad Behaviour, directed by Alice Englert
 Girl, directed by Adura Onashile
 Heroic, directed by David Zonana
 MAMACRUZ, directed by Patricia Ortega
 Mami Wata, directed by C.J. Obasi
 La Pecera, directed by Glorimar Marrero Sánchez
 Scrapper, directed by Charlotte Regan
 Shayda, directed by Noora Niasari
 Slow, directed  by Marija Kavtaradze
 Sorcery, directed by Christopher Murray
 When It Melts, directed by Veerle Baetens

World Cinema Documentary Competition
 20 Days in Mariupol, directed by Mstyslav Chernov
 5 Seasons of Revolution, directed by Lina
 Against the Tide, directed by Sarvnik Kaur
 The Eternal Memory, directed by Maite Alberdi
 Fantastic Machine, directed by Axel Danielson
 Iron Butterflies, directed by Roman Liubyi
 Is There Anybody Out There?, directed by Ella Glendining
 The Longest Goodbye, directed by Ido Mizrahy
 Milisuthando, directed by Milisuthando Bongela
 Pianoforte, directed by Jakub Piątek
 Smoke Sauna Sisterhood, directed by Anna Hints
 Twice Colonized, directed by Lin Alluna

Next 
 Bravo, Burkina!
 Divinity
 Fremont
 Kim's Video
 King Coal
 Kokomo City
 To Live and Die and Live
 The Tuba Thieves
 Young. Wild. Free.

Midnight 
 birth/rebirth, directed by Laura Moss
 In My Mother's Skin, written and directed by Kenneth Dagatan
 Infinity Pool, written and directed by Brandon Cronenberg
 My Animal, directed by Jacqueline Castel
 Onyx the Fortuitous and the Talisman of Souls, directed by Andrew Bowser
 Polite Society, written and directed by Nida Manzoor
 Run Rabbit Run, directed by Daina Reid
 Talk to Me, directed by Danny and Michael Philippou

Special Screenings 
 Justice, directed by Doug Liman
 Stephen Curry: Underrated, directed by Peter Nicks

Spotlight 
 The Eight Mountains, written and directed by Felix van Groeningen and Charlotte Vandermeersch
 L'Immensità, directed and co-written by Emanuele Crialese
 Joyland, directed and co-written by Saim Sadiq
 Other People's Children, written and directed by Rebecca Zlotowski
 Squaring the Circle (The Story of Hipgnosis) by Anton Corbijn

Kids 
 Aliens Abducted My Parents and Now I Feel Kinda Left Out, directed by Jake Van Wagoner
 The Amazing Maurice, directed by Toby Genkel and Florian Westermann
 Blueback, directed and co-written by Robert Connolly

Indie Episodic 
 Chanshi, directed by Mickey Triest and Aaron Geva
 The Night Logan Woke Up (La nuit où Laurier Gaudreault s'est réveillé), written and directed by Xavier Dolan
 Poacher, directed by Richie Mehta
 Willie Nelson and Family, directed by Thom Zimny and Oren Moverman

Awards 
The following awards were given out:

Grand Jury Prizes 
 U.S. Dramatic Competition – A Thousand and One (A.V. Rockwell)
 U.S. Documentary Competition – Going to Mars: The Nikki Giovanni Project (Joe Brewster and Michèle Stephenson)
 World Cinema Dramatic Competition – Scrapper (Charlotte Regan)
 World Cinema Documentary Competition – The Eternal Memory (Maite Alberdi)

Audience Awards 
 Festival Favorite – Radical (Christopher Zalla)
 U.S. Dramatic Competition – The Persian Version (Maryam Keshavarz)
 U.S. Documentary Competition – Beyond Utopia (Madeleine Gavin)
 World Cinema Dramatic Competition – Shayda (Noora Niasari)
 World Cinema Documentary Competition – 20 Days in Mariupol (Mstyslav Chernov)
 NEXT – Kokomo City

Directing, Screenwriting and Editing 
 U.S. Dramatic Competition – Sing J. Lee for The Accidental Getaway Driver
 U.S. Documentary Competition – Luke Lorentzen for A Still Small Voice
 World Cinema Dramatic Competition – Marija Kavtaradze for Slow
 World Cinema Documentary Competition – Anna Hints for Smoke Sauna Sisterhood
 Waldo Salt Screenwriting Award – Maryam Keshavarz for The Persian Version
 Jonathan Oppenheim Editing Award: U.S. Documentary – Daniela I. Quiroz for Going Varsity in Mariachi
 NEXT Innovator Prize – Kokomo City

Special Jury Prizes 
 U.S. Dramatic Special Jury Award: Ensemble Cast – The cast of Theater Camp
 U.S. Dramatic Special Jury Award: Creative Vision – The creative team of Magazine Dreams
 U.S. Documentary Special Jury Award: Clarity of Vision – The Stroll (Kristen Lovell and Zackary Drucke)
 U.S. Documentary Special Jury Award: Freedom of Expression – Bad Press
 World Cinema Dramatic Special Jury Award: Cinematography – Lílis Soares for Mami Wata
 World Cinema Dramatic Special Jury Award: Best Performance – Rosa Marchant for When it Melts
 World Cinema Dramatic Special Jury Award: Creative Vision – Sofia Alaoui for Animalia
 World Cinema Documentary Special Jury Award: Creative Vision – Fantastic Machine
 World Cinema Documentary Special Jury Award: Verité – Against the Tide

Short Film Awards 
 Short Film Grand Jury Prize – When You Left Me on That Boulevard
 Short Film Jury Award: U.S. Fiction – Rest Stop
 Short Film Jury Award: International Fiction – The Kidnapping of the Bride
 Short Film Jury Award: Nonfiction – Will You Look at Me
 Short Film Jury Award: Animation – Night Bus
 Short Film Special Jury Award, International: Directing – AliEN0089 by Valeria Hoffman
 Short Film Special Jury Award, U.S.: Directing – The Vacation by Jarreau Carrillo

Special Prizes 
 Alfred P. Sloan Feature Film Prize – The Pod Generation
 Sundance Institute/Amazon Studios Producers Award for Nonfiction – TBA
 Sundance Institute/Amazon Studios Producers Award for Fiction – TBA
 Sundance Institute/Adobe Mentorship Award for Editing Nonfiction – TBA
 Sundance Institute/Adobe Mentorship Award for Editing Fiction – TBA
 Sundance Institute/NHK Award – TBA

Acquisitions
 The Deepest Breath: Netflix
 In My Mother's Skin: Amazon Prime Video
 Joyland: Oscilloscope
 My Animal: Paramount Pictures (excluding Canada)
 Other People's Children: Music Box Films
 Run Rabbit Run: Netflix
 Squaring the Circle (The Story of Hipgnosis): Utopia
 Little Richard: I Am Everything: Magnolia Pictures and CNN Films
 Kokomo City: Magnolia Pictures
 Fair Play: Netflix 
 Theater Camp: Searchlight Pictures
 Flora and Son: Apple TV+
 Passages: MUBI (including Ireland and Latin America)
 A Little Prayer: Sony Pictures Classics
 Talk to Me: A24
 The Eternal Memory: MTV Documentary Films
 Nam June Paik: Moon Is the Oldest TV: Greenwich Entertainment and PBS Films
 The Persian Version: Sony Pictures Classics
 The Starling Girl: Bleecker Street
 Shayda: Sony Pictures Classics
 Magazine Dreams: Searchlight Pictures
 Shortcomings: Sony Pictures Classics

Source:

References

External links

Sundance Film Festival
Sundance Film Festival
Sundance Film Festival
January 2023 events in the United States